2′,3′-Cyclic-nucleotide 3'-phosphodiesterase (EC 3.1.4.37, CNPase, systematic name nucleoside-2′,3′-cyclic-phosphate 2′-nucleotidohydrolase) is an enzyme that in humans is encoded by the CNP gene.

Reaction 

CNPase catalyzes the following reaction:

nucleoside 2′,3′-cyclic phosphate + H2O  nucleoside 2′-phosphate

Function 

CNPase is a myelin-associated enzyme that makes up 4% of total CNS myelin protein, and is thought to undergo significant age-associated changes. It is named for its ability to catalyze the phosphodiester hydrolysis of 2',3'-cyclic nucleotides to 2'-nucleotides, though a cohesive understanding of its specific physiologic functions are still ambiguous.

Structural studies have revealed that four classes of CNPases belong to one protein superfamily. CNPase's catalytic core consists of three alpha-helices and nine beta-strands. The proposed mechanism of CNPases phosphodiesterase catalytic activity is similar to the second step of the reaction mechanism for RNase A.

CNPase is expressed exclusively by oligodendrocytes in the CNS, and the appearance of CNPase seems to be one of the earliest events of oligodendrocyte differentiation. CNPase is thought to play a critical role in the events leading up to myelination.

CNPase also associates with microtubules in brain tissue and FRTL-5 thyroid cells, and is reported to have microtubule-associated protein-like activity (MAP; see MAP2), being able to catalyze microtubule formation at low molar ratios. Deletion of the C-terminus of CNPase or phosphorylation abolish the catalytic activity of microtubule formation. CNPase can link tubulin to cellular membranes, and might be involved in the regulation cytoplasmic microtubule distribution.

CNPase has also been demonstrated to inhibit the replication of HIV-1 and other primate lentiviruses by binding the retroviral Gag protein and inhibiting the genesis of nascent viral particles.  Whether this is a biological function of CNPase or a coincidental activity remains unclear.

References

External links

Further reading 

 
 
 
 
 
 
 
 
 
 
 
 
 
 
 
 
 
 
 
 
 
 

Human proteins